Gymnoscelis barbuti is a moth in the family Geometridae which is endemic to Tahiti.

References

Moths described in 2009
Endemic fauna of Tahiti
barbuti